Phelips is a surname. Notable people with the surname include:

Edward Phelips (disambiguation), multiple people
Robert Phelips ( 1586–1638), English politician
William Phelip (died 1441), English politician

See also
Phelps (surname)